Vilasrao Deshmukh Government Medical college , Latur is a state Medical institution in Maharashtra, India. This college comprises various clinical and para/pre-clinical departments working alongside the General Hospitals. Government Medical College was established in 2000 by the then current Chief Minister of Maharashtra, Vilasrao Deshmukh.
Recently under the directive of Honourable Health Minister of Maharashtra State, the hostels are undergoing a modernisation programme which includes, but not restricted to Hostel renovation, WiFi services to individual students.

References

External links
Maharshtra University of Health Sciences

Medical colleges in Maharashtra
Education in Latur
Educational institutions established in 2001
Affiliates of Maharashtra University of Health Sciences
2001 establishments in Maharashtra